Tell Her is a 2020 Russian children's drama film written and directed by Aleksandr Molochnikov about the effects of divorce, a woman goes with her son to America, leaving her husband, who cannot imagine life without a son, the film stars Kay Aleks Getts, Artyom Bystrov, Svetlana Khodchenkova and Wolfgang Cerny.

Tell Her was theatrically released in Russia on May 13, 2021 by Walt Disney Studios.

Plot 
The 1990s of the boy Sasha (Kay Aleks Getts), that he almost does not remember his parents Sveta (Svetlana Khodchenkova) and Artyom (Artyom Bystrov) being happy together. The family lives in Saint Petersburg. Artyom works as a teacher. Sveta is tired of everyday difficulties and her husband's lack of aspiration for a better life. She leaves him for the American Michael (Wolfgang Cerny). Sasha has a very warm relationship with his father, and he spends three days a week with him. The relationship between the former spouses is so difficult, but the situation is aggravated by the fact that Sveta tells her son about the preparations for their move to the United States. Artyom, of course, is against it. Mom and Dad, each with their own support team from grandparents, win Sasha to their side. The child is going through such manipulations hard, and only his serious illness makes one of the parents - Artyom - give up and come to terms with the move.

In America, Sasha quickly settled in, made friends, and even became class president. But after a while there are problems. It all starts with an innocent prank in Sasha's opinion with the deception of pizzeria employees, which is considered a serious offense in America, and ends with a false denunciation of Michael to the police. Sveta believes that it's all about the bad influence of her father, and intends to stop their communication even on the phone. Suddenly Artyom arrives himself, but an attempt to sit down at the negotiating table ends in a scandal. Sasha escapes, simultaneously setting Michael's car on fire. Sveta catches up with him. After long and emotional explanations, they reconcile, and Sasha asks his mother to let him go to Russia with his dad. The last shots of the film, where a father and son are riding a bicycle in St. Petersburg, say that this time Sveta had to give in.

Cast

Production 

The plot of the film is partly autobiographical for Aleksandr Molochnikov. His parents, like that of the main character, are divorced; as a child, he lived in America. Although Molochnikov himself says that the story has nothing to do with his family directly.

Filming 
Principal photography took place in 2019 on the territory of Saint Petersburg, Russia, and California, United States.

Release 
The premiere of the film took place at the festival 31st Kinotavr-2020 was held in the city of Sochi from September 11 to 18, 2020, the film participated in the main competition. It was released in the Russian Federation on May 13, 2021 by Walt Disney Studios.

References

External links 
 

2020 films
2020s Russian-language films
2020s children's drama films
Russian children's drama films
Films set in Saint Petersburg
Films about dysfunctional families
Films about post-traumatic stress disorder
2020 multilingual films
Russian multilingual films
2020 drama films